Gonçalo Pereira Ribeiro Telles (24 May 1922 – 11 November 2020) was a Portuguese politician and landscape architect. He was born and died in Lisbon.
He was a founder of the People's Monarchist Party in 1974, and led it until 1994, when he left the party. He later founded the ecologist movement Movimento Partido da Terra, now called MPT – Partido da Terra.

He was also Minister for Quality of Life in the Democratic Alliance governments, and one of the first Portuguese politicians to call attention to ecological problems, having an influence far beyond the tiny size of the parties he led.

Academic and professional career 
Gonçalo Ribeiro Telles graduated in Agronomy Engineering and finished the Free Course in Landscape Architecture at the Higher Institute of Agronomy of the Technical University of Lisbon (ISA).

He began his professional life in the services of the Lisbon City Council, while teaching at ISA, becoming a disciple of Francisco Caldeira Cabral, pioneer of landscape architecture in Portugal. With this professor, he will publish the book A Árvore in Portugal, a reference work on tree species existing in our country.

In the Lisbon Chamber he joined, from 1951 to 1953, the Division of forestation and Gardening, passing in 1955 the landscape architect of the Office of Urbanisation Studies of cml, directed by the engineer Guimarães Lobato, where he remained until 1960. 

From 1971 to 1974 he also directed, as a landscape architect, the Biophysical planning and Green Spaces Sector of the Housing Development Fund. 

The most striking project of his career is probably the garden of the Calouste Gulbenkian Foundation, which he signed with António Viana Barreto and[5] which earned him, ex aequo, the Valmor Prize of 1975.

Also in the capital, it is worth mentioning the set of projects that conceived, between 1998 and 2002, at the request of the City Council, the main and secondary green structures of the Metropolitan Area of Lisbon, and which are now in different stages of implementation: the Alcântara Valley and Radial de Benfica, the Chelas Valley, the Peripheral Park, the Monsanto Green Corridor and the Integration into the Main Green Structure of Lisbon of the Eastern and Western Riverside Zone.

Among his other projects, it is also worth noting the public space of the Estacas District, in Alvalade; the gardens of the Chapel of St. Jerome in Restelo; the vegetation cover of the hill of The Castle of St. George the Amália Rodrigues Garden, next to Eduardo VII Park, designed in 1996.

As a guest full professor, he taught at the University of Évora, where he created in the 1990s his degrees in Landscape Architecture and Biophysical Engineering.

In April 2013 he was awarded the Sir Geoffrey Jellicoe Prize, the most important international distinction in landscape architecture.

Political and public activity 
Gonçalo Ribeiro Telles began his public intervention as a member of the Catholic Agrarian and Rural Youth, a youth structure linked to Portuguese Catholic Action.

In 1945, he participated in the foundation of the National Culture Center, of which he is now the number one associate, and also President of the General Assembly, in whose sessions he accentuated his opposition to salazar's regime.

With Francisco Sousa Tavares, in 1957 he founded the Movement of Independent Monarchists, which would follow the Popular Monarchical Movement.

In 1958, he expressed his support for the presidential candidacy of Humberto Delgado.

In 1959, he was among the signatories of the Letter to Salazar on repression services.

In 1967, during the Lisbon floods, it publicly imposed itself against the existing urbanization policies.

In 1969, he was part of the Monarchical Electoral Commission, which joins the lists of Mário Soares's Portuguese Socialist Action in the Electoral Commission of Democratic Unity (CEUD) coalition, led by Soares, to run for the National Assembly. He would not be elected, like the other members of the democratic opposition lists. In 1971, he helped found the Monarchical Convergence movement, a meeting of three monarchical resistance movements: the Popular Monarchical Movement, the Monarchical Popular League and the Portuguese Renewal.

After the Revolution of April 25, 1974, with Francisco Rolão Preto, Henrique Barrilaro Ruas, João Camossa de Saldanha, Augusto Ferreira do Amaral, Luís Coimbra, among others, founded the Monarchical People's Party, whose Directory he presided over. He was UnderSecretary of State for the Environment in the I, II and III Provisional Governments, and Secretary of State of the same portfolio, in the 1st Constitutional Government, headed by Mário Soares.

In 1979, he allied himself with Francisco Sá Carneiro in the formation of the Democratic Alliance, a coalition through which he was elected deputy to the Assembly of the Republic, consecutively, in the legislative of 1979, 1980 and 1983. Between 1981 and 1983, he was part of the VIII Constitutional Government, headed by Francisco Pinto Balsemão, as Minister of State and Quality of Life. During his ministry, he assumes a major role in establishing a regime on land use and spatial planning, by creating the protected areas of the National Agricultural Reserve, the National Ecological Reserve and the bases of the Municipal Master Plan.

As a deputy in the Assembly of the Republic had responsibilities in the proposals of the Law of Bases of the Environment, the Law of Regionalization, the Conditioning Law of the Planting of Eucalyptus, the Law of Wastelands, the Hunting Law, and the Environmental Impact Law.

In 1984, after leaving the government and already away from PPM, he founded the Alfacinha Movement, with which he presented himself candidate for the City Council of Lisbon, getting the election as councillor. In 1985, he returned to the Assembly of the Republic, now as an independent member, elected on the lists of the Socialist Party (PS). In 1993, he founded the Earth Party Movement, whose presidency he abandoned in 2007.

In 2010, integrating the Citizenship and Marriage Platform, he publicly spoke out against same-sex marriage, legalized at the time in Portugal.

In 2009 and 2013, he supported the candidacy headed by António Costa in the municipal elections for the Municipality of Lisbon.

In 2016, at the IndieLisboa film festival, the documentary A Vossa Terra - landscapes of Gonçalo Ribeiro Teles, by director João Mário Grilo, was presented.

Commendations 
On October 31, 1969, president Américo Tomás, the rank of Officer of the Ancient, Nobilíssimo and Enlightened Military Order of Santiago da Espada, of Scientific, Literary and Artistic Merit

On April 6, 1988, president Mário Soares, the Grand Cross of the Military Order of Christ

On June 10, 1990, president Mário Soares, the Grand Cross of the Order of Freedom

On May 25, 2017, by President Marcelo Rebelo de Sousa, the Grand Cross of the Order of Infante D. Henrique

References

External links 
biographical profile of Ribeiro Telles on monarchist website Realistas (Royalists) (Portuguese).
Parts 1, 2, 3, 4, 5 and 6 of documentary on Ribeiro Telles life and philosophy, directed in 2008 by Rita Saldanha (Portuguese).
, a video of a discussion on landscaping in Lisbon on RTPN where Gonçalo Ribeiro Telles intervenes from 2:08 to 9:58 (Portuguese).
, debate on environment and economical development with Ribeiro Telles' participation (Portuguese).
. Gonçalo Ribeiro Telles describes why we supported José Sá Fernandes from 1:02 to 2:10 (Portuguese).
Lisbon pays tribute to Ribeiro Telles through mural in Alvalade (Portuguese).
https://www.imdb.com/name/nm2826360/bio

1922 births
2020 deaths
People from Lisbon
Landscape architects
Portuguese monarchists
Earth Party politicians
People's Monarchist Party (Portugal) politicians
Academic staff of the University of Évora